The following is a timeline of the history of the city of Ocaña, Colombia.

Prior to 20th century

 1570 - Ocaña is founded by the captain Francisco Fernandez de Contreras.
 1575 - Ocaña is given the city title.
 1584 - San Francisco Church built.
 1596 - San Agustin Temple built.
 1680 - Plaza del 29 de Mayo restored.
 1749 - Virgen de Torcoroma church built.
 1813 - The Campaña Admirable troops are formed by Simon Bolivar, during the independence war.
 1820 - The martyrs of Ocaña are written off by the royalist guerrilla Los Colorados.
 1826 - El dulce nombre church built.
 1828 - The Constituent Convention is held in the San Francisco Temple, in this convention the Gran Colombia is dissolved. 
 1849 - Ocaña and near populations found the province of Ocaña.
 1851 - Columna de la libertad de los esclavos (Freedom of slaves column) erected at the center of the Plaza del 29 de Mayo.
 1875 - Ermitage of Nuestra Señora de las gracias de Torcoroma built.
 1889 - La Presentación School opens.
 1891 - Claridad Santa Ana Hospital inaugurated.
 1893 - La jabonería (soap factory) in business.
 1894 - Club Ocaña inaugurated.

20th century

 1916 - The Jose Eusebio Caro School built.
 1919 - First vehicle in Ocaña.
 1929 - A 46 km long gondola lift is built between Ocaña and Gamarra, connecting Ocaña to the Magdalena River.
 1932 - The Cristo Rey statue erected in the Cristo Rey mount.
 1934 - The jesuit community leaves the city.
 1937 - The San Francisco Temple is recognized as national monument.
 1940
 San Antonio Nursing home inaugurated.
 Bust of Francisco de Paula Santander erected in Plaza 29 de Mayo.
 1944 - Rural School of Ocaña founded.
 1945
 Home School of Ocaña is founded.
 Commerce Club of Ocaña established.
 Morales Berti teather inaugurated.
 1946
 Ocaña-Cucuta alternate road inaugurated, covering other municipalities and townships.
 First edition of Ocaña's Carnival.
 Club de leones established.
 1955 - Emiro Quintero Cañizares Hospital built.
 1959 - First edition of Desfile de los Genitores.
 1962 - Kennedy School inaugurated.
 1970 - Aeropuerto Aguas Claras (airport) built.
 1972 
 February: Urbanization in the actual neighborhood of Buenos Aires is held by Pío Quesada.
 October: TELECOM (Colombian company of telecommunications) headquarters opens in Ocaña.
 1974 - Desfile de los Genitores reorganized.  
 1975 - Headquarters of the Francisco de Paula Santander university start operating.
 1976 - Headquarters of the national educational institute SENA built.
 1977 - Public Library of Ocaña opens, in the San Francisco cloister.

21st century

 2009 - State airline Satena restarts air traffic in the Aeropuerto Aguas Claras with a daily flight to Cucuta, Capital of Norte de Santander.

See also
 Ocaña, Norte de Santander

Other cities in Colombia:
 Timeline of Bogotá
 Timeline of Cali
 Timeline of Cartagena, Colombia

Bibliography

In Spanish
 http://academiaocana.blogspot.com.co/
 http://viveocana.com/historia/

External links

.
Ocana
History of Colombia
Years in Colombia